Saint-Martial-de-Valette is a commune in the Dordogne department in Nouvelle-Aquitaine in southwestern France.

Population

See also
Communes of the Dordogne department

References

External links

 Saint-Martial-de-Valette official site

Communes of Dordogne